Terokhada is an upazila in Khulna District, Khulna, Bangladesh.

Geography
It has 26304 households and total area 186.54 km2.

Demographics
As of the Terokhada Upazilla Website, Terokhada has a population of 118854. Males constitute 51.01% of the population, and females 48.99%. Around 637 people lives per km in this Upazilla. Terokhada has an average literacy rate of 65% (7+ years).

Administration
Terokhada Upazila is divided into six union parishads: Ajgora, Barasat, Chagladoho, Modhupur, Sachiadaho, and Terokhada. The union parishads are subdivided into 33 mauzas and 100 villages.

See also
Upazilas of Bangladesh
Districts of Bangladesh
Divisions of Bangladesh

References

Upazilas of Khulna District
Khulna Division